Eduardo Garcia (born February 4, 1977) is an American politician who represents the 56th Assembly District, which includes cities and unincorporated communities in eastern Riverside County and Imperial County, including Blythe, California, Brawley, California, Bermuda Dunes, Calexico, California, Calipatria, Cathedral City, California, Coachella, California, Desert Hot Springs, El Centro, Heber, Holtville, Imperial, Indio, California, Mecca, California, Oasis, North Shore, California, Salton City, California, Thermal, California, Thousand Palms, and Westmorland, California.

Elected in 2014, Garcia is the current chair of Water, Parks and Wildlife.

Garcia also serves on the Assembly Committees on Appropriations, Communications and Conveyance, Governmental Organization and Utilities and Energy.

In March 2015 Garcia was appointed to chair the Select Committee on Renewable Energy Development and Restoration of the Salton Sea. In his first term he was successful in securing $80.5 million in the State Budget to fund Salton Sea restoration and mitigation projects; such as dust suppression, wetland and habitat recovery.

In 2016, Assemblymember Garcia had over two dozen bills and resolutions signed by Governor Brown.

A graduate of local public schools, Garcia attended Coachella Valley High School and the University of California, Riverside. He also completed the "Senior Executives in State and Local Government" Public Administration program from the John F. Kennedy School of Government at Harvard University and earned a master's degree from the University of Southern California School of Policy, Planning and Development.

Garcia was first elected to the Coachella City Council in November 2004. In 2006, at the age of 29, he became Coachella's first elected Mayor.

He is a father, husband and life-long resident of the Coachella Valley.

2016 California State Assembly

2018 California State Assembly

2020 California State Assembly

References

  Biography

External links 
 
 Campaign website
 Join California Eduardo Garcia

Democratic Party members of the California State Assembly
Living people
1977 births
Hispanic and Latino American state legislators in California
People from Indio, California
People from Coachella, California
21st-century American politicians